M Enayetur Rahim is a justice on the Appellate Division of Bangladesh Supreme Court. Earlier, he was justice of the High Court Division, Bangladesh Supreme Court. He also served as the chairman of the International Crimes Tribunal 1.

Early life and education 
Rahim was born on 11 August 1960 in the District of Dinajpur, Bangladesh. His father M. Abdur Rahim, who was a Bangladesh Awami League politician and the Member of Parliament from Dinajpur-3 and mother Mrs. Nazma Rahim. Rahim completed his Masters in Mass Communication and Journalism and a law degrees from the University of Dhaka.

Career 
Rahim became a lawyer of the District Courts on 30 October 1986.

On 2 January 1989, Rahim became a lawyer on the High Court Division of Bangladesh Supreme Court.

On 15 May 2002, Rahim became a lawyer of the Appellate Division of Bangladesh Supreme Court.

Rahim was elected as the Secretary of Supreme Court Bar Association in 2005.

Rahim became Additional Attorney General for Bangladesh in January, 2009.

Rahim was appointed an Additional Judge of the High Court Division on 30 June 2009.

Rahim was made a permanent Judge of the same Division on the 6 June 2011.

On 1 August 2013, Rahim, Justice M Moazzem Husain, and Justice Quazi Reza Ul-Hoque in a verdict declared the registration of Bangladesh Jamaat-e-Islami as a political party cancelled.

On 23 February 2014, Rahim was made the chairperson (head judge) of the International Crimes Tribunal-1.

On 10 December 2020, Rahim and Justice Md Mostafizur Rahman granted bail to Dilip Khalko, a convicted rapist, after he married the victim, who was his cousin and 14 when she became pregnant after rape.

On 26 August 2021, Rahim and Justice Md Mostafizur Rahman in a verdict declared that the Anti-Corruption Commission does not have the authority to freeze suspect's assets or bank accounts without the explicit authorization of the courts. The verdict was given in a petition filed by a pharmacy owner in Cox's Bazar whose accounts in Social Islami Bank Limited were frozen on the orders of Md Sharif Uddin, Assistant Director of the Anti-Corruption Commission in Chittagong.

On 10 September 2021, Rahim and Justice Md Mostafizur Rahman criticized Special Judge Court-5 judge Md Iqbal Hossain for granting bail to Deputy Inspector General of Prison Police Partha Gopal Banik in secret after Banik was arrested with 8 million in cash. Rahim and Justice Md Mostafizur Rahman rejected a petition that called for the High Court to direct the state to protect private phone conversations from being intercepted and recorded illegally on 29 September 2021.

On 9 January 2022, Rahim was made a judge of the Appellate Division of the Bangladesh Supreme Court.

Personal life 
Rahim's only Brother Iqbalur Rahim is a Member of Parliament from Dinajpur-3.

References 

Supreme Court of Bangladesh justices
20th-century Bangladeshi lawyers
21st-century Bangladeshi judges
1960 births
Living people